Sheikh Nasser served as the Ambassador of the State of Qatar to Washington (and non-resident ambassador to Mexico) until 2007 when he left the diplomatic service. Previously, his lengthy diplomatic career included appointments as Ambassador to Korea, Italy, United Nations and the United Kingdom respectively as well as nonresident ambassador to Denmark, Sweden, Iceland, Ireland, the Netherlands, Norway, Argentina, Canada, Colombia, Cuba, Nicaragua, Bosnia and Herzegovina, and Malta.

He remains an Advisory Board Member of the Next Century Foundation and he continues to administer the $100 million Hurricane Katrina relief fund established by the State of Qatar.

Since retirement from the diplomatic service, Sheikh Nasser has been studying for a doctorate at the London School of Economics. Starting from 2009, he is a fellow at the Weatherhead Center for International Affairs at Harvard University.

Sheikh Nasser has also served as Qatar’s permanent representative to the Organisation for the Prohibition of Chemical Weapons and the International Maritime Organization.

He holds a bachelor's degree from West Michigan University, a Masters from Johns Hopkins, and a law degree from City (UK). He is a fellow of Princeton. and a visiting fellow at the Centre for Islamic Studies in Oxford.

References 

Ambassadors of Qatar to the United States
Ambassadors of Qatar to Mexico
Ambassadors of Qatar to South Korea
Ambassadors of Qatar to Italy
Ambassadors of Qatar to the United Kingdom
Ambassadors of Qatar to Denmark
Ambassadors of Qatar to Sweden
Ambassadors of Qatar to Iceland
Ambassadors of Qatar to Ireland
Ambassadors of Qatar to the Netherlands
Ambassadors of Qatar to Norway
Ambassadors of Qatar to Argentina
Ambassadors of Qatar to Canada
Ambassadors of Qatar to Colombia
Ambassadors of Qatar to Cuba
Ambassadors of Qatar to Nicaragua
Ambassadors of Qatar to Malta
Ambassadors of Qatar to Bosnia and Herzegovina
Permanent Representatives of Qatar to the United Nations
Permanent Representatives of Qatar to the Organisation for the Prohibition of Chemical Weapons
Permanent Representatives of Qatar to the International Maritime Organization
Living people
Qatari diplomats
Year of birth missing (living people)